Trophée Chopard (English: "Chopard Trophy") is awarded by a jury of professionals to two young actors in order to recognise and encourage their career. It was founded in 2001 by Chopard and has since been presented every year during the Cannes Film Festival. An award trophy in the form of a gold-plated film strip is presented to the honorees.

Winners

Presenters

References

External links 
 Official Website

Awards established in 2001
Cannes Film Festival
French film awards